El Beit Beitak ({Variously spelled El Beet Beetak, El bait baitak, or El bet betak ) البيت ييتك, Egyptian Arabic for Feel at home, is a popular talk show on Egyptian television that features famous writers, entertainers and politicians. It is broadcast daily at 10:00 pm, except for Thursday and Friday.

El Beit Beitak (literally "the home is your home") first aired in October 2004 during Ramadan on Channel 1 and was hosted by a different number of presenters. Today the show has gained tremendous popularity. It is broadcast on Egypt's Channel 2 as well as the Egyptian Satellite Channel. It is hosted by Mahmoud Saad, Tamer Amin and Khairy Ramadan. Its phenomenal popularity and high viewership resulted in it being to a certain degree a tool of influencing or even shaping Egyptian public opinion. Its format is flexible, dealing primarily with current affairs. Its coffee house chat style deals with a wide variety of issues ; from politics, to sports, art, gossip, business, and even fund raising.

Mahmoud Saad, who presents the show in alternating days with the Amin and Ramadan duo, was a journalist in the popular weekly "Sabah el Khair". This gave him firsthand knowledge of the inner workings of the Egyptian art and media industry. This knowledge, coupled with his down to earth personality and frequent humanitarian relief sketches to the sick and needy, endeared him to the Egyptian public and are key to the program's success. His limited English language skills are well compensated with Amin's fluent English as a graduate of the "alson" language institute.

The program's diversity was a novelty in Middle East media. For example, a January 27, 2010 episode devoted a section to female sexuality which was followed by the weekly religious section with the liberal, Western-dressed Sheikh Khaled ElGuindy. Saad's talent, simple religiosity, and open mind, enabled him to debate both female orgasm and deep religious matters with the same ease. This is unique in a country where about 90% of Moslem females wear the Islamic Hijab. On more than one occasion Saad alluded that former president Mubarak himself regularly viewed the show.

The show changed its name to "Masr el Naharda" in 2010. No clear reasons was given.  The events of January 2011 took the whole nation, including the Masr el Naharda show, by storm. A few days after January 25 Saad resigned the show, or was terminated, and joined the revolution in perfect timing immediately before the fall of Mubarak. His triumphant return to the show only days later placed him as the mouthpiece of the fledgling revolution. However, a sudden, almost bizarre, turn of events was to take place just days later. In a memorable episode he had a live argument, or fight, with his former boss, Anas el Fiki, who along with all Mubarak's key men, was about to be publicly humiliated. Anas, sensing his imminent and dismal fate (days later he would be portrayed in the Revolutionary media as an Egyptian Goebels), revealed live that Saad's salary is in the 10 million Egyptian pound range. Saad's image as a champion of the poor was damaged. He resigned shortly afterwards probably due to a major salary reduction.

As of April 2011, Saad, who was by far Egypt's most popular TV personality, has been off the air. It was revealed in mid April that he will be co hosting a talk show on "El Mehwar" Satellite Channel.

Saad's associates in the show did not fare much better, with Ramadan resigning in March and Tamer Ameen, the last of the legendary show's founding fathers generation, resigning live on air April 3, 2011. None gave reasons for their resignations other than vague statements such as "well, change is the way life is".

See also 
Masr El-Nahrda

References

Egyptian television talk shows
2000s Egyptian television series
Egyptian Radio and Television Union original programming